Group B of EuroBasket 2017 consisted of , , , ,  and . The games were played between 31 August and 6 September 2017. All games were played at the Menora Mivtachim Arena in Tel Aviv, Israel.

Standings

All times are local (UTC+3).

Matches

Germany v Ukraine

Lithuania v Georgia

Italy v Israel

Georgia v Germany

Ukraine v Italy

Israel v Lithuania

Georgia v Ukraine

Lithuania v Italy

Germany v Israel

Ukraine v Lithuania

Italy v Germany

Israel v Georgia

Germany v Lithuania

Georgia v Italy

Israel v Ukraine

References

Group B
International basketball competitions hosted by Israel
2017–18 in Ukrainian basketball
2017–18 in Israeli basketball
2017–18 in Lithuanian basketball
2017–18 in Georgian basketball
2017–18 in Italian basketball
2017–18 in German basketball
Basketball, 2017 EuroBasket Group B
2010s in Tel Aviv